Gravit 
is a free and open-source gravity simulator distributed under the GNU General Public License. The program is available for all major operating systems, including Linux and other Unix-like systems, Microsoft Windows and Mac OS X.

Gravit uses the Barnes–Hut algorithm to simulate the n-body problem.

Description

Gravit is a gravity simulator which runs under Linux, Windows and Mac OS X. It is released under the GNU General Public License which makes it free. It uses Newtonian physics using the Barnes-Hut N-body algorithm. Although the main goal of Gravit is to be as accurate as possible, it also creates beautiful looking gravity patterns. It records the history of each particle so it can animate and display a path of its travels. At any stage you can rotate your view in 3D and zoom in and out. Gravit uses OpenGL with Lua, SDL, SDL_ttf and SDL_image.

Features
 View the simulation in 3D, optionally using stereoscopic imaging
 Can be installed as a screen saver in Windows
 Record a simulation, then play back at any speed
 Load / Save a recorded simulation
 Mouse controllable rotation
 Console with script execution
 See an octtree being created in real-time
 Colours can be based on mass, velocity, acceleration, momentum or kinetic energy
 Initial particle locations are scriptable (Lua)

Status 

As of some time in 2017, the website is dead, though the GitHub repository remains alive.

See also 

 Galaxy- A similar open source stellar simulator
Gravitation
Newtonian mechanics

References

External links
 Official Gravit Website.
 Gravit Source code repository on github
 Project Page on Ohloh

Free astronomy software
Free science software
Science education software